Tim Ruddy (born April 27, 1972) is a former American football offensive lineman. He was born in Dunmore, Pennsylvania. Tim Ruddy was a center for the Miami Dolphins from 1994 to 2003.  Tim went on to acting and writing as well as working on the movie Ballistic in the art department.

High school
 Named honorable mention All-America by Sporting News as a Senior
 Selected as 15th best prospect in the nation by Atlanta Journal-Constitution
 Earned the state championship in the shot put as a senior
 Earned two letters as two-way tackle, long snapper and kicker
 Lettered three times in track, performing in the discus and shot put
 Graduated from Dunmore High School with perfect 4.0 GPA
 Nicknamed 'Big Master'

College career
Ruddy attended The University of Notre Dame from 1990–1994. He was a four-year letterman and two year starter during this time. He was selected as a second-team All-America and first-team All-Independent by The Football News and the Associated Press. Ruddy also posted a perfect 4.0 GPA his junior and senior years at Notre Dame. He graduated with 3.86 GPA. He holds a B.S. in mechanical engineering. He also earned post-graduate scholarships from the NCAA and the National Football Foundation. He is also a member of Tau Beta Pi (National Engineering Honor Society).

Professional career
Ruddy was the second-round draft choice (65th overall) of Miami in 1994.  Ruddy started 140 games of his 156 games played, in which all 16 of those non-starts were his rookie year, but he saw time in all of them. During most of his career, he was the center for Dan Marino, who has held almost every meaningful NFL passing record and is widely recognized as one of the greatest quarterbacks in football history.

In 2001, Ruddy was named to his first and only Pro Bowl. He was originally named a second alternate, but replaced the injured Tom Nalen of the Denver Broncos. Ruddy was the first Miami center to be selected to the Pro Bowl since Hall of Fame center Dwight Stephenson in 1987. The last few years of Ruddy's career were plagued with knee problems and his playing time was limited. Ruddy was released by Miami following the 2003 season. It was rumored he talked to a few teams after his departure from Miami, but did not sign with any team.

Ruddy was selected as one of the top 40 Miami Dolphin players of all time, and was named as a second team offensive line selection to the Pennsylvania Football News All-Century Team.

Filmography

1993               Gettysburg                         Maj. Charles Marshall

1997-1999     Glenroe                               Oliver O.'Driscoll

2001               Ballykissangel                    Hackett

2003              Gods and Generals             Pvt. McMillan

2007              W.C.                                       Joe

2019             79 Parts: Directors Cut        Bomber

2020.            I Know This Much Is True   Robocop

External links
The Pennsylvania Football News All-Century Team

1972 births
Living people
American Conference Pro Bowl players
American football centers
Miami Dolphins players
Notre Dame Fighting Irish football players
Players of American football from Pennsylvania
Sportspeople from Scranton, Pennsylvania